Nagrakata is a village in the Nagrakata community development block in the Malbazar subdivision of the Jalpaiguri district, West Bengal.National Highway 17 passes through Nagrakata. It is a station on the New Jalpaiguri-Alipurduar-Samuktala Road Line.

Geography

Location        

National Highway 31C passes through Nagrakata. It is a station on the New Jalpaiguri-Alipurduar-Samuktala Road Line.

Area overview
Gorumara National Park has overtaken Jaldapara National Park in footfall. The Malbazar subdivision is presented in the map alongside. It is a predominantly rural area, with 88.62% of the population living in rural areas and 11.32% living in urban areas. Tea gardens in the Dooars and Terai regions produce 226 million kg of India's total tea crop.  Some tea gardens were identified in the 2011 census as census towns or villages.

Civic administration 
The Nagrakata police has jurisdiction over a part of the community development block, and the village serves as the headquarters of the Nagrakata community development block.

Demographics
According to the 2011 Census of India, Nagrakata had a total population of 356. There were 169 (47%) males and 187 (53%) females. There were 53 persons in the age range of 0 to 6 years. The total number of literate people in Nagrakata was 174 (57.43% of the population over 6 years).

Transport
Nagrakata Railway Station serves the village and nearby areas, which lies in the New Jalpaiguri–Alipurduar–Samuktala Road line of Northeast Frontier Railway, Alipurduar railway division.

References

External links
 About Nagrakata
 Satellite map of Nagrakata
 

Villages in Jalpaiguri district